Brigadier Tariq Mehmood  (8 Oct 1938 – 29 May 1989) was a Pakistani military officer of Pakistan Army. He was serving as the Commander of Pakistan Army's Special Service Group (SSG), when he died in an accident in 1989 due to malfunctioning of his parachute during a free fall display at Rahwali, near Gujranwala. Mehmood was one of the most decorated Army officers who served with the SSG in two wars and various special operations.

Early life and education

Mehmood was born on 8 October 1938 at Multan. His father was a senior police officer. After completing his intermediate education from Gordon Christian College, Rawalpindi in 1956, he went to Lahore and graduated from Government College in 1959. He was also a member of Government College cricket team captained by Javed Burki. After graduation he went to Peshawar to study law at University of Peshawar, but he also got selected for Pakistan Army at the same time. He made a choice to serve his country and joined Pakistan Military Academy as a cadet in 1960. He graduated from PMA in 1963 with a double BSc in Military science and War studies. He also attended Command and Staff College, Quetta, and completed his Staff Course in 1969.

Military career

Mahmood was commissioned in 2nd Battalion of The Baloch Regiment in 1960, passing out from PMA in 1963. The same year, he was inducted in 51st Paratrooper Division, Airborne Corps, and from there, he was selected for the Special Service Group (SSG). After completing the Special Training of SSG he was posted to the 1st Commando Battalion (Yaldram)(Shaheen Company).

1965 Indo-Pakistani War
In 1965, SSG was preparing for covert Operations in Kashmir, meanwhile Mehmood was selected for an advance course with U.S. Army Special Forces, but he opted himself for covert operations instead of leaving for the United States to attend the advance course. He was awarded Sitara-e-Juraat (SJ) for his acts of bravery during the Indo-Pak war of 1965. Tariq Mahmood was promoted to the rank of Major in 1970 and was stationed in Peshawar. Mehmood was posted as the commandant Parachute Training School.

1971 Indo-Pakistani War
In 1971, Mehmood volunteered to go East Pakistan to participate in the Bangladesh-Pakistani War of 1971. In this conflict, Mehmood was sent to Shahjalal International Airport (Dhaka Airport) to lead an operation against Indian-led Bangladeshi forces. The airport was heavily guarded and it was considered a no-fly zone. Mehmood commanded the Shaheen Company, 1st commando battalion and his company saw heavy fighting in the airport. After 34 hours, the Shaheen Company gained control of the airport and its surrounding areas. Both sides had suffered heavy casualties and the airport was nearly destroyed in the battle.

1984 Siachen War
In 1979, he was promoted to Colonel, and in 1982, he was promoted to the rank of Brigadier. Mehmood, now a one-star general, was made commandant of the Special Service Group. In 1984, Mehmood commanded the Special Service Group at Siachen Conflict. SSG launched an aggressive and quick operation against the Indian Army. Mehmood secured a narrow victory in 1984.

Other operations 
Throughout the 1980s, the SSG and ISI were closely collaborating with the U.S. Special Forces and Special Activities Division in order to lead the secret operation known as Operation Cyclone. Mehmood was also a commanding officer of the fierce Battle for Hill 3234 in January 1988, although the Soviet Airborne troops managed to hold their position. On 5 September 1986, Pan Am Flight 73 was hijacked in Karachi, Sindh. He came to public prominence after having led the successful Operation PANAM to liberate the airline from terrorists. The hijackers opened fire on the SSG team, killing and injuring the passengers but soon all the hijackers were arrested and many lives were saved. Later, in 1987–88, he led operations against criminals in Sindh.

Death and legacy

Brigadier TM died on 29 May 1989 when he led a team of SSG paratroopers for a free-fall at Pakistan Army Aviation School, Rahwali, Gujranwala. The jump was part of Army Aviation's Passing Out parade. The incident happened during a demonstration jump from an Army's Mi-17 helicopter when Mehmood's main and reserve parachute failed to open. According to the investigations, his first parachute did not open and the ropes were badly entangled. Mehmood attempted to cut the ropes with his dagger, and tried to open the backup parachute. Unintentionally, he had released both back up and main parachutes, and he descended at very high speed.

Awards and decorations

Notes

References

Further reading

1938 births
1989 deaths
Pakistani Muslims
I
Baloch Regiment officers
Special Services Group officers
Government Gordon College alumni
Pakistani military officers
Parachuting deaths